Tiit Pääsuke (born December 22, 1941) is an Estonian painter.

Pääsuke was born in Põltsamaa, Põltsamaa Parish, in Jõgeva County.

Awards 
 1975 Kristjan Raud Award
 1981 Kristjan Raud Award
 1982 Merited artist of the ESSR
 1992 Konrad Mägi Award
 1999 Order of the White Star, Fourth Class
 2000 Annual Award of the Cultural Endowment of Estonia
 2012 Estonian State Cultural Award
 2018 Award for Life's Work from the Cultural Endowment of Estonia
 2021 Lifetime Achievement Awards for Culture

Gallery

References

1941 births
Living people
People from Põltsamaa
20th-century Estonian painters
20th-century Estonian male artists
21st-century Estonian painters
Recipients of the Order of the White Star, 4th Class